Yoann Barbas (born 24 October 1988 in Lavelanet) is a French cyclist riding for .

Major results

2009
 3rd Overall Ronde de l'Isard
 7th Overall Tour des Pays de Savoie
2010
 4th Overall Ronde de l'Isard
 5th Overall Tour des Pays de Savoie
2011
 9th Overall Giro della Valle d'Aosta
2012
 3rd Overall Tour des Pays de Savoie
2013
 1st Overall Tour des Pays de Savoie
 9th Overall Tour Alsace
2014
 4th Overall Tour des Pays de Savoie
2016
 Troféu Joaquim Agostinho
1st  Mountains classification
1st  Combination classification

References

1988 births
Living people
French male cyclists